Rye is a census-designated place in Cleveland County, Arkansas, United States. Per the 2020 census, the population was 123.

Demographics

2020 census

Note: the US Census treats Hispanic/Latino as an ethnic category. This table excludes Latinos from the racial categories and assigns them to a separate category. Hispanics/Latinos can be of any race.

Education 
Public education for elementary and secondary students is available from the Woodlawn School District, which leads to graduation from Woodlawn High School.

References

Census-designated places in Cleveland County, Arkansas
Census-designated places in Pine Bluff metropolitan area
Census-designated places in Arkansas